Naomi Higgins is an Australian writer, performer, comedian, influencer, and former Twitch streamer. She is best known for writing and starring in Why Are You Like This, for which she won an AWGIE comedy award.

Early life 
Higgins has a double degree in science and engineering. She had a humble upbringing and dreamed of being a stand up comedian from a young age.

Career 
Higgins was a 2016 Raw Comedy National Finalist. Danielle Walker, the 2016 Raw Comedy National Winner, co-hosts the podcast Batch Bitch alongside Higgins.

Higgins co-hosted the online video game review show Gamey Gamey Game, along with Evan Munro-Smith and Ben Russell.

In 2021, Higgins' TV show Why Are You Like This was released in Australia by the Australian Broadcasting Corporation and internationally by Netflix. She co-wrote the series with Humyara Mahbub and Mark Bonanno, and starred as Penny, a younger version of herself. Higgins and her co-writers won the Comedy - Situation or Narrative category at the 54th Annual AWGIE Awards in 2021 for their work on Why Are You Like This.

Filmography

Television

References

External links 
 

Living people
Australian stand-up comedians
Australian women comedians
Australian women podcasters
Australian podcasters
Comedians from Melbourne
1992 births